He Shaolin (born 28 February 2003) is a Chinese footballer currently playing as a forward for Guangzhou.

Club career
Born in Lijiang, Yunnan, He started playing football at the age of eight. His first club was Lijiang Yuanheng. He joined Yunnan Kunlu in 2017, and a year later he travelled to Portugal to train with professional side Cova da Piedade, alongside teammate Yang Xinle. In 2019, he travelled to both Croatia and Russia, training with Spartak Moscow for three months.

On his return to China, he became the youngest player in the 2019 China League Two, making his debut on 13 July against Kunshan. At the end of the season, he agreed a deal with Chinese Super League side Guangzhou.

Personal life
He is of Nakhi ethnicity.

Career statistics

Club
.

References

2003 births
Living people
People from Lijiang
Footballers from Yunnan
Chinese footballers
China youth international footballers
Association football forwards
China League Two players
Guangzhou F.C. players
21st-century Chinese people